Roosevelt Gardens is a census-designated place (CDP) in Broward County, Florida, United States. The population was 2,456 at the 2010 census.

Geography
Roosevelt Gardens is located at  (26.141213, -80.180268).

According to the United States Census Bureau, the CDP has a total area of 0.8 km (0.3 mi²), all land.

Demographics

At the 2000 census there were 1,923 people, 661 households, and 427 families living in the CDP.  The population density was 2,320.2/km (6,068.2/mi²).  There were 733 housing units at an average density of 884.4/km (2,313.0/mi²).  The racial makeup of the CDP was 1.04% White, 97.66% African American, 0.16% Native American, 0.21% from other races, and 0.94% from two or more races. Hispanic or Latino of any race were 0.31%.

Of the 661 households 30.7% had children under the age of 18 living with them, 23.4% were married couples living together, 34.5% had a female householder with no husband present, and 35.4% were non-families. 28.1% of households were one person and 6.4% were one person aged 65 or older.  The average household size was 2.91 and the average family size was 3.61.

The age distribution was 33.0% under the age of 18, 9.6% from 18 to 24, 27.9% from 25 to 44, 19.7% from 45 to 64, and 9.8% 65 or older.  The median age was 31 years. For every 100 females, there were 88.7 males.  For every 100 females age 18 and over, there were 84.0 males.

The median household income was $17,423 and the median family income  was $20,536. Males had a median income of $16,760 versus $22,796 for females. The per capita income for the CDP was $9,559.  About 31.4% of families and 33.2% of the population were below the poverty line, including 47.1% of those under age 18 and 33.3% of those age 65 or over.

As of 2000, English was the mother tongue for 100% of the population.

References

Census-designated places in Broward County, Florida
Census-designated places in Florida